Hondo Valle is a town in the Elías Piña province of the Dominican Republic characterized by its beautiful mountains and cold climate.

History 
Through the Law No. 916 of August 12, 1978, the Municipal District of Hondo Valle, Municipality of Comendador, was erected in municipality, being integrated by the sections Aniceto Martinez, Juan de la Cruz, Sabana de la Loma, Los Guineos , Juan Santiago, Monte Mayor, Rancho de la Guardia and Rancho de Pedro.

When Francisco del Rosario Sanchez launched his invasion of The Dominican Republic with the intention of overthrowing Pedro Santana and expelling his country from Spanish jurisdiction, he entered through this city from the Haitian side.

Population 
According to the national Census of 2002, the municipality has a total population of 10,647, of which 5,538 were men and 5,109 were women. The urban population of the municipality was 35.24%.

Economy 
The main economic activity of the municipality is agriculture and some livestock, tourism and trade with Haiti.

Climate

References

Sources 
 – World-Gazetteer.com

Populated places in Elías Piña Province
Municipalities of the Dominican Republic